Naham is a moshav in central Israel. Located near Beit Shemesh, it falls under the jurisdiction of Mateh Yehuda Regional Council.

History
Moshav Naham was established in 1950 by immigrants from Yemen and Cochin on part of the lands of the moshava of Hartuv, abandoned during the 1948 Arab–Israeli War. It was named after a member of the Tribe of Judah in the Book of Chronicles 4:19 — "And the sons of the wife of Hodiah, the sister of Naham, were the father of Keilah the Garmite, and Eshtemoa the Maacathite."

References

Moshavim
Populated places established in 1950
Populated places in Jerusalem District
Cochin Jews
Indian-Jewish culture in Israel
Yemeni-Jewish culture in Israel
1950 establishments in Israel